are the satellites of the Japanese spy satellite program. It was started as a response to the 1998 North Korean missile test over Japan. The satellite program's main mission is to provide early warning of impending hostile launches in the region. This program is under the direct control of the cabinet. All Information Gathering Satellites have been launched by H-IIA rockets from the Tanegashima Space Center.

History
On 28 March 2003, presumably partly in response to North Korea's launch of a Taepodong-1 missile over Japan in 1998, and partly to provide a source of satellite images other than through cooperation with the US, where the US charged roughly US$10,000 for each satellite image, Japan launched a radar and an optical spy satellite, officially known as IGS 1A and IGS 1B.· These satellites follow one another at 37-minute separation in a 492 km orbit, which passes over Pyongyang at 11:22 each day, according to observations collected on the satellite watching mailing list.

The program suffered a setback when Japan lost the second pair of satellites because of an H-IIA launch failure on 29 November 2003.

Except the satellite which failed in launching, a second optical surveillance satellite IGS 3A was launched on 11 September 2006.

A third optical satellite IGS 4A and a second radar satellite IGS 4B were launched on 24 February 2007. IGS 4A is a more advanced and experimental optical satellite.

A fourth optical satellite IGS 5A was launched on 28 November 2009. This satellite has a higher resolution than the previous generations.

Late March 2007, the first SAR satellite in the series, IGS 1B, suffered a critical power failure.· The satellite has since been observed to steadily come down and was clearly no longer under control. An uncontrolled re-entry of this satellite occurred on 26 July 2012. Since summer 2010, another of the SAR satellites, IGS 4B has also been unable to carry out its monitoring functions.

On 9 February 2020, Japan launched IGS-Optical 7 reconnaissance satellite from the Tanegashima Space Center aboard an H-2A rocket. The launch had been delayed by 12-days due to a nitrogen leak, located within a system that provided conditioned air to the rocket, which was discovered sometime before the countdown to launch was aborted on 27 January. Following the discovery of the leak, the rocket was returned to its vertical assembly building, where it underwent repairs. Following the completion of the repairs, the rocket was rolled back out to Launch Pad No. 1 on 7 February, before the scheduled second launch attempt.

List of launches

References

External links
"Lifting The Darkness On Japan's Next Spy Satellite", SpaceDaily, 27 November 2006.

Imaging reconnaissance satellites
Space program of Japan
Synthetic aperture radar satellites
Spacecraft launched by H-II rockets
Satellite series
Military equipment introduced in the 2000s